Haimo, also spelled Hamo, Heimo, Hamon, Haim, Haym, Heym, Aymo, Aimo, etc., is a masculine given name of Germanic origin. The Old French forms are Haimon, Aymon, Aimon, Aymes. It is a hypocoristic form of various Germanic names beginning with the radical haim-, meaning "home".

Appearance in modern Anglophone naming
Haimo is the origin of a wide range of surnames, including English surnames like Hame, Haim, Haime, Haimes, Hains, Haines, Hayns, Haynes, Hammon, Hammond, and Fitzhamon. The Old French form Haimon was then combined with the diminutive suffix -et, giving the pet-name Hamunet, which in turn gave rise to the English name Hamnett and its variants.

People

Aimo (d. 1173), French monk, mystic and saint
Heymo (bishop of Wrocław) (r. 1120–1126)

Aymon
Aymon de Briançon (d. 1211), archbishop of Tarentaise
Aymon II of Geneva (r. 1265–1280), count
Aymon, Count of Savoy (r. 1329–1343)
Aymon III of Geneva (r. 1367), count
Aymon of Ortinge (fl. 1369), French mercenary captain
Aymon of Challant (d. c. 1387), Aostan nobleman
Aymon I de Chissé (d. 1428), bishop of Nice and Grenoble
Aymon II de Chissé (d. 1450), bishop of Nice and Grenoble

Haimo
Haimo of Auxerre (d. c. 865), French monk and biblical scholar
Haimo de Valognes (r. 1086), Anglo Norman lord in Suffolk 

Haymo
Haymo of Halberstadt (died 853), German monk, bishop and biblical scholar
Haymo of Faversham (d. c. 1243), English Franciscan scholar

Hamo
Hamo the Steward (fl. 1071–1076), Anglo-Norman sheriff of Kent
Hamo Dapifer (d. c. 1100), Anglo-Norman official
Hamo (dean of Lincoln) (fl. 1189–1195)
Hamo (dean of York) (fl. 1216–1219)
Hamo de Crevecoeur (d. 1263), Anglo-Norman official
Hamo le Strange (d. 12727/1273), English crusader
Hamo Hethe (c. 1275–1352), bishop of Rochester
Hamo Thornycroft (1850–1925), English sculptor

Hamon
Hamon Dentatus (d. 1047), Norman baron
Hamon de Massey (fl. c. 1070), Anglo-Norman baron
Hamon Sutton (d. 1461/1462), English MP

See also
Duke Aymon, a character in several Old French and Italian epics
Heime, a figure popular in German and Scandinavian legends
Haymon, a figure of Tyrolean legend
Deborah and Franklin Haimo Awards for Distinguished College or University Teaching of Mathematics, given by the Mathematical Association of America

References